Chen Chao-ming (born 17 December 1951) is a Taiwanese politician.

Education
Subsequently, Chen studied public administration at National Chengchi University.

Political career
Chen was elected to the Legislative Yuan as an independent in 1998 and served until 2002. He joined the Democratic Progressive Party for the 2004 election cycle, but did not win. In 2011, Chen was named Kuomintang candidate for Miaoli County, and won. He retained his seat in the 2016 elections, defeating former legislators Tu Wen-ching and Kang Shih-ju. In his 2020 legislative campaign, Chen again received support from the Kuomintang.

Chen's Kuomintang membership was suspended in August 2020, after he was detained and questioned regarding a legal case involving allegations of bribery. The Taipei District Court ruled in July 2022 that Chen had violated the Anti-Corruption Act, sentenced him to seven years and eight months imprisonment, and seized NT$1 million from him.

References

1951 births
Living people
Miaoli County Members of the Legislative Yuan
Members of the 4th Legislative Yuan
Members of the 8th Legislative Yuan
Members of the 9th Legislative Yuan
Kuomintang Members of the Legislative Yuan in Taiwan
Members of the 10th Legislative Yuan
Taiwanese politicians convicted of corruption